The 1986 NCAA Division I men's basketball tournament involved 64 schools playing in single-elimination play to determine the national champion of men's NCAA Division I college basketball. It began on March 13, 1986, and ended with the championship game on March 31 in Dallas, Texas. A total of 63 games were played.

Louisville, coached by Denny Crum, won the national title with a 72–69 victory in the final game over Duke, coached by Mike Krzyzewski. Pervis Ellison of Louisville was named the tournament's Most Outstanding Player.  Louisville became the first team from outside a power conference to win the championship since the expansion to 64 teams, and remains one of only two teams to do so (the other team was UNLV in 1990).

The 1986 NCAA Men's Basketball Championship Tournament was the first tournament to use a shot clock limiting the amount of time for any one offensive possession by a team prior to taking a shot at the basket.  Beginning with the 1986 tournament, the shot clock was set at 45 seconds, which it would remain until being shortened to 35 seconds beginning in the 1994 NCAA Division I men's basketball tournament, and further shortened to 30 seconds (the same as NCAA women's basketball) starting with the 2016 NCAA Division I men's basketball tournament. The 1986 tournament was also the last to not feature the three-point shot.

LSU's 1985–86 team is tied for the lowest-seeded team (#11) to ever make the Final Four with the 2005–06 George Mason Patriots, the 2010–11 VCU Rams, the 2017–18 Loyola-Chicago Ramblers, and the 2020–21 UCLA Bruins. As of 2018, they are the only team in tournament history to beat the top 3 seeds from their region. LSU began its run to the Final Four by winning two games on its home court, the LSU Assembly Center, leading to a change two years later which prohibited teams from playing NCAA tournament games on a court which they have played four or more games in the regular season. Cleveland State University became the first #14 seed to reach the Sweet Sixteen, losing to their fellow underdog, Navy, by a single point. This was also the first year in which two #14 seeds reached the second round in the same year, as Arkansas-Little Rock beat #3-seed Notre Dame; however, they lost their second-round game in overtime.  Both feats have only occurred one other time. Chattanooga reached the Sweet Sixteen as a 14-seed in 1997, and Old Dominion and Weber State both reached the second round as 14-seeds in 1995.

Every regional final featured a #1 or #2 seed playing a team seeded #6 or lower. The lone #1 seed to not reach the Elite Eight, St. John's (West), was knocked out in the second round by #8 Auburn, which lost to #2 Louisville in the regional final.

It can be argued that these upsets by the 14-seeds launched the NCAA tournament's reputation for having unknown teams surprise well-known basketball powers, and both happened on the same day. Indiana's stunning loss to Cleveland State would be part of the climax in the best-selling book A Season On The Brink.

Another story of the tournament was when Navy reached the Elite 8 thanks to stunning performances by David Robinson. This tournament had no Pac 10 teams advance beyond the round of 64. This did not occur again until 2018.

Schedule and venues

The following are the sites that were selected to host each round of the 1986 tournament:

First and Second Rounds
March 13 and 15
East Region
 Greensboro Coliseum, Greensboro, North Carolina (Host: Atlantic Coast Conference)
Midwest Region
 University of Dayton Arena, Dayton, Ohio (Host: University of Dayton)
Southeast Region
 LSU Assembly Center, Baton Rouge, Louisiana (Host: Louisiana State University)
West Region
 Dee Events Center, Ogden, Utah (Host: Weber State University)
March 14 and 16
East Region
 Carrier Dome, Syracuse, New York (Host: Syracuse University)
Midwest Region
 Hubert H. Humphrey Metrodome, Minneapolis, Minnesota (Host: University of Minnesota)
Southeast Region
 Charlotte Coliseum, Charlotte, North Carolina (Host: University of North Carolina at Charlotte)
West Region
 Long Beach Arena, Long Beach, California (Host: Long Beach State University)

Regional semifinals and finals (Sweet Sixteen and Elite Eight)
March 20 and 22
Southeast Regional, Omni Coliseum, Atlanta, Georgia (Host: Georgia Institute of Technology)
West Regional, The Summit, Houston, Texas (Hosts: University of Houston, Rice University)
March 21 and 23
East Regional, Brendan Byrne Arena, East Rutherford, New Jersey (Hosts: Seton Hall University, Big East Conference)
Midwest Regional, Kemper Arena, Kansas City, Missouri (Host: Big 8 Conference)

National semifinals and championship (Final Four and championship)
March 29 and 31
Reunion Arena, Dallas, Texas (Host: Southwest Conference)

Dallas became the 22nd host city, and Reunion Arena the 24th host venue, for the Final Four. While the city itself has not hosted another Final Four, the Dallas-Fort Worth Metroplex would host again in 2014 at AT&T Stadium. Three of the four venues used for regional sites, and all four host cities, were Final Four host cities; only The Summit did not host a Final Four (all Final Fours in Houston have been at either the Astrodome or NRG Stadium). This also marked the first time that domed stadiums were used in the opening rounds, with Syracuse's Carrier Dome and the Metrodome in Minneapolis hosting games. The Metrodome and the Long Beach Arena were the only new venues this year. While the city of Long Beach itself had not hosted games before, it is part of the Los Angeles metropolitan area which has hosted multiple times. Since 1986, every tournament has included at least one domed stadium, something that had only happened five times beforehand (1971 and 1981–84). LSU's Assembly Center, renamed for NCAA career scoring leader and LSU legend Pete Maravich in 1988, hosted for the third and final time, having previously hosted the Mideast regional semifinals and finals in 1976 and the Mideast regional quarterfinals in 1977.

Teams

Bracket
* – Denotes overtime period

East Regional – East Rutherford, New Jersey

Midwest Regional – Kansas City, Missouri

Southeast Regional – Atlanta, Georgia

West Regional – Houston, Texas

Final Four – Dallas, Texas

Final Four Officials
 Joe Forte (LSU-Louisville)
 Dick Paparo (LSU-Louisville)
 Lenny Wirtz (LSU-Louisville)
 Paul Galvan (Kansas-Duke)
 John Clougherty (Kansas-Duke)
 Tom Fincken (Kansas-Duke)
 Hank Nichols (Louisville-Duke)
 Pete Pavia (Louisville-Duke)
 Don Rutledge (Louisville-Duke)

The 1986 Final Four was the first in which the NCAA assigned a separate three-man crew for the championship game. Previously, three of the six officials from the semifinals were melded into a crew for the championship.

The championship game was the last for future Naismith Memorial Basketball Hall of Fame inductee Hank Nichols, who became the NCAA's national supervisor of officials. The Louisville-Duke matchup was Nichols' sixth championship game assignment.

Announcers
Studio Hosts:

CBS:
Brent Musburger (First and Second Rounds), and Jim Nantz (Regional Semifinals to National Championship Game)<P>
ESPN:
Bob Ley and Dick Vitale

Brent Musburger and Billy Packer – West Regional semifinal (Louisville–North Carolina) and Regional Final at Houston, Texas; Final Four at Dallas, Texas
Gary Bender and Doug Collins – Second Round at Syracuse, New York and Dayton, Ohio; East Regional at East Rutherford, New Jersey
Dick Stockton and Larry Conley – Southeast Regional at Atlanta, Georgia
Verne Lundquist and James Brown – Midwest Regional semifinal (Kansas–Michigan State) and Regional Final at Kansas City, Missouri
Fred White and Gary Thompson – Midwest Regional semifinal (N.C. State–Iowa State) at Kansas City, Missouri
Tom Hammond and Irv Brown – West Regional semifinal (UNLV–Auburn) at Houston, Texas
Jim Nantz and Bill Raftery – Second Round at Greensboro, North Carolina
Mike Patrick and James Brown – Second Round at Charlotte, North Carolina
Dick Stockton and Billy Packer – First round (North Carolina–Utah) at Ogden, Utah; Second Round at Baton Rouge, Louisiana and Minneapolis, Minnesota
Tim Ryan and Lynn Shackleford – Second Round at Ogden, Utah
Verne Lundquist and Larry Conley – First round (Auburn–Arizona) and Second Round (St. John's–Auburn) at Long Beach, California
Mike Walden and Larry Conley – First round (Maryland–Pepperdine) and Second Round (UNLV–Maryland) at Long Beach, California
Bob Rathbun and Bucky Waters – First round (Oklahoma–Northeastern) at Greensboro, North Carolina
Ralph Hacker and Dan Bonner – First round (Indiana–Cleveland State, Navy–Tulsa) at Syracuse, New York
Mike Patrick and Irv Brown – First round (Illinois–Fairfield, Kentucky–Davidson) at Charlotte, North Carolina
Jim Thacker and Dave Gavitt – First round (Western Kentucky–Nebraska) at Charlotte, North Carolina
Tom Hammond and Billy Cunningham – First round (Georgetown–Texas Tech) at Dayton, Ohio
Frank Herzog and Gary Thompson – First round (N.C. State–Iowa) at Minneapolis, Minnesota
Frank Fallon and Bob Ortegel – First round (Bradley–UTEP) at Ogden, Utah
Bob Carpenter and Joe Dean – First round (LSU-Purdue) at Baton Rouge, Louisiana

See also
 1986 NCAA Division II men's basketball tournament
 1986 NCAA Division III men's basketball tournament
 1986 NCAA Division I women's basketball tournament
 1986 NCAA Division II women's basketball tournament
 1986 NCAA Division III women's basketball tournament
 1986 National Invitation Tournament
 1986 National Women's Invitation Tournament
 1986 NAIA Division I men's basketball tournament
 1986 NAIA Division I women's basketball tournament

References

NCAA Division I men's basketball tournament
Ncaa
Basketball in the Dallas–Fort Worth metroplex
Basketball in Houston
NCAA Division I men's basketball tournament
NCAA Division I men's basketball tournament